Federico Orlando  (13 October 1928 – 8 August 2014) was an Italian politician and journalist. He joined the newspaper, Il Giornale, in 1974, and eventually become co-editor. He served as a member of the Chamber of Deputies from 1996 to 2001. He co-founded the online newspaper Articolo 21, liberi di... in 2001.

References

1928 births
2014 deaths
Italian newspaper editors
Italian male journalists
20th-century Italian journalists
Deputies of Legislature XIII of Italy
Italian newspaper founders
20th-century Italian male writers